Harris Westminster Sixth Form (also known as Harris Westminster or HWSF) is a selective sixth form in central London which was established with the goal of increasing the rate of entry to top universities among students from areas of socio-economic deprivation.  Its aim is to "combine the strengths of Westminster School in teaching academically able students with the Harris Federation’s experience in establishing and running outstanding maintained sector schools across London". The Harris Westminster building was bought by the government for £45 million in order to create the school.

History 
The school was formed from an agreement in 2013 between Harris Federation and Westminster School. It aimed to take on 125 pupils in September 2014, reaching an enrollment of 250 the following year. 167 pupils were offered places in the first year, almost 30% of whom were entitled to free school meals. In 2017 a collection of assemblies from the school's first three years was published.

Location 
The school is located at 11 Tothill St in Steel House, a former Ministry of Justice building built in 1936, within walking distance of Westminster School, Westminster Abbey and St Margaret's Church on Parliament Square, where its assemblies are usually held.

Building
The 8 storey uninspiring building was converted by Nicholas Hare Architects. The street level ground floor is devoid of natural light while the seventh floor has magnificent views over the rooftops of the historic buildings of Westminster. Hare's solution was to maintain a central lift column, with toilets and associated services, on the dark side. The ground floor became a hall and the classrooms are on the subsequent floors either facing Tothill street or the alley behind. The seventh floor was renovated for the cafeteria.

The building  had been designed in 1936 by  Sir John Burnett, Tait and Lorne. The original portland stone façade is adorned with stone figures of Greek gods, Vulcan, God of Fire, Atlas carrying the world on his shoulders and Hercules stealing the golden Apples of Immortality.

Admissions  
Entrance to Harris Westminster Sixth Form is by 2 entrance exams in 2 chosen subjects and an academic interview on the applicant's preferred subject (The exam score threshold for an interview for Priority 3/4 students in the 2021 cycle was 425, in the 2022 cycle it was 420, and in the 2023 cycle it was 407). The offer is conditional on the students' performance at GCSE with a minimum requirement of 6 7s-9s and at least 7 grades in the 4 subjects chosen for study. Preference is given to Priority 1/2 students, recipients of Free School Meals or children looked after by their local authority, who have a reduced threshold for interview and offer.  Applications typically open at the start of September and close at the beginning of December.

Curriculum 
Harris Westminster Sixth Form offers a mixed curriculum, consisting of both A Level and Cambridge Pre-U subjects.  The A Levels offered include Edexcel English Literature, OCR A Mathematics and Further Mathematics, AQA Biology, Edexcel Chemistry, OCR A Physics, OCR Art, WJEC/Eduqas Economics, AQA Drama & Theatre, CIE Geography (offered in Year 12 for students opting to also do an EPQ in Year 13), OCR History, Edexcel Music, OCR Politics and Russian. The Cambridge Pre-U is offered in French, Spanish, PTE and Art History. Subjects with the smallest uptakes (presently German, Drama & Theatre, Music and Classical Languages) are studied at Westminster School. Year 12 students also take part in 'Cultural Perspectives' courses, which aim to develop cultural capital and to broaden the  curriculum.

Every Tuesday afternoon there is also a Lab lecture: students can spend one hour of the session listening to and asking questions of a vast range of speakers from across a range of disciplines. A small number of students is invited after each lecture to Principal’s Tea where they are able to interact with the guests in a smaller group and hone their intellectual and networking skills.

Extracurricular activities 
The school also runs weekly compulsory societies in every subject studied at A-Level or Pre-U and societies for prospective Law and Medicine students. On a Thursday afternoon, the school takes part in sports at sites across London or other activities such as Bridge and Debating. The school runs an annual House Cup competition made up of a wide range of competitive activities (19 in 2019/20). These include House football, netball and University Challenge.

Examination performance and recognition
In its first year of AS Level results, 30% of overall grades were 'A', with the highest achieving departments being Mathematics and Geography at 40% 'A' grades. In its first year of A2 Level results, over 40% of results were A/A* and 25% of their students achieved at least 3 A grades with 50% taking up places at Russell Group universities and six at Oxford or Cambridge. In 2018, 47% of the A-level grades were A/A* (or equivalent), including 17% A* grades (or equivalent). Just under a half of the students attained at least an AAB combination of grades, while a quarter achieved A*AA or better. This marked the best examination performance in the school's history. In 2019, the school received 37 Oxbridge offers, bettering the record of many renowned private schools. In 2020, the school received 44 Oxbridge offers (25 from Oxford and 19 from Cambridge), beating their own record set the year prior. 

In 2016, the school was investigated by Ofsted and consequently rated "outstanding" in all areas.

In 2019, it was highlighted by the Good Schools Guide as an example of an effective partnership between state and private schools.

Also in 2019, it was named "Sixth Form College of the Year" by The Sunday Times with the Oxbridge success and support for disadvantaged students noted.

In 2020 the partnership between Harris Westminster and Westminster School was recognised with the "Independent-State School Partnership Award" in the TES Independent School awards. 

   

The current headteacher is James Handscombe.

References

External links 
 

2014 establishments in England
Free schools in London
Educational institutions established in 2014
Education in the City of Westminster
Westminster